Lindsey De Grande (born 26 April 1989) is a Belgian runner, who specializes in the middle distance events.

Achievements

References

1989 births
Living people
Belgian female middle-distance runners
Sportspeople from Bruges
21st-century Belgian women